German submarine U-229 was a Type VIIC U-boat of Nazi Germany's Kriegsmarine during World War II.

The submarine was laid down on 3 November 1941 at the Friedrich Krupp Germaniawerft yard at Kiel as yard number 659, launched on 20 August 1942, and commissioned on 3 October under the command of Oberleutnant zur See Robert Schetelig.

After training with the 5th U-boat Flotilla at Kiel, U-229 was transferred to the 6th U-boat Flotilla, (which was based at Saint-Nazaire on the French Atlantic coast), on 1 March 1943, for front-line service.

She was sunk by a British warship on 22 September 1943.

Design
German Type VIIC submarines were preceded by the shorter Type VIIB submarines. U-229 had a displacement of  when at the surface and  while submerged.

She had two shafts and two  propellers.

U-229 was fitted with five  torpedo tubes (four fitted at the bow and one at the stern), fourteen torpedoes, one  SK C/35 naval gun, 220 rounds, and an anti-aircraft gun. The boat had a complement of between 44 and 60.

Service history

First patrol
U-229 left Kiel on 20 February 1943. She crossed the North Sea, passed through the gap between Iceland and the Faroe Islands and entered the Atlantic Ocean.

She sank the British freighter  – part of convoy SC 121 on 10 March 1943 southeast of Cape Farewell, Greenland. In the same attack she damaged the British freighter Coulmore, which remained afloat but was abandoned by her crew.

She then sank the Swedish Vaalaren in the same vicinity on 5 April. There were no survivors.

U-229 arrived at St Nazaire on 17 April.

Second patrol
The boat's second foray commenced with her departure from St Nazaire on 11 May 1943. On the 17th, west of the Bay of Biscay, she was attacked by a Catalina flying boat of No. 190 Squadron RAF. The damage inflicted was such that she was forced to return to France, arriving in Bordeaux on 7 June.

Third patrol
Having moved from Bordeaux to La Pallice in early August 1943, the boat departed the latter port on the 31st.

Fate
She was sunk on 22 September 1943 south-east of Cape Farewell, Greenland in position , by depth charges, gunfire and ramming by the British destroyer . All 50 hands were lost.

Wolfpacks
U-229 took part in four wolfpacks, namely:
 Neuland (4 – 6 March 1943) 
 Ostmark (6 – 11 March 1943) 
 Stürmer (11 – 16 March 1943) 
 Leuthen (15 – 23 September 1943)

Summary of raiding history

References

Bibliography

External links

German Type VIIC submarines
World War II submarines of Germany
U-boats commissioned in 1942
U-boats sunk in 1943
U-boats sunk by British warships
1942 ships
Ships built in Kiel
Ships lost with all hands
Maritime incidents in September 1943